The 2016 Qatar International Handball Tournament was the 10th edition of the Qatar men's International Handball Tournament, held in Doha, Qatar between 03–7 April as a friendly handball tournament organised by the Qatar Handball Association as a preparation of the host nation to the 2016 Summer Olympics, Participated in the tournament the host nation, Qatar, the national teams of Brazil and Argentina, and the Qatari handball team  El Jaish.

Results

Round robin

Final standing

References

External links
page of the tournament on Qatar Handball Federation Official Website

Qatar International Handball Tournament